Yorkeys Knob is a coastal suburb of Cairns in the Cairns Region, Queensland, Australia.

Geography 

Yorkeys Knob is a coastal suburb with predominantly low-lying land (less than 10 metres above sea level) with the exception of the hill (known as Yorkeys Knob) rising to 60 metres on the coast at Yorkeys Point. The northern part of the suburb near the coast is residential, but the majority of the land use is rural, mainly used for growing sugarcane. There is a long, sandy beach along the Coral Sea.

The Finfish Group operate a 17 hectare pond farm (called Ponderosa) which is capable of producing 350 tonnes of fish per annum. They principally raise giant grouper fish as they are fast growing with a high commercial value.

The suburb is bounded by the Coral Sea to the north, Thomatis Creek to the east, Captain Cook Highway to the south, and Half Moon Creek to the north-west.

History
Yorkeys Knob is situated in the Djabugay (Tjapukai) traditional Aboriginal country.

Yorkeys Knob got its name from George Lawson, a Yorkshire-born, Cairns-based beche-de-mer fisherman. (From the nickname Yorkey, and the Hill being the "Knob".)

On 10 June 1886, Yorkey Lawson reported the loss of a man and his wife from Green Island. They had left to visit the wreck of the Upolu, intending to return the same day. Lawson made a search for them, but was unable to find any trace of them, not even an accident. The pilot cutter was sent to search for the couple.

Lawson built a homestead adjoining the Mount Buchan estate near what is now Yorkeys Knob. During the off-fishing season he and his sons farmed pumpkins, sweet potatoes and paddy melons, but not successfully. Whatever the bandicoots and pigs didn't eat, the crocodiles did. Lawson used the mangroves near his homestead for the firewood and water needed for his beche-de-mer smoking station on Green Island.

Yorkey's Knob State School opened on 18 February 1957. It originally occupied a site on corner of Wattle Street and Cunningham Street. The school relocated to its current site in 1980 and the former site was given to the Musgrave Shire Council (now Cairns Regional Council) to become a community centre (known officially since 1996 as Old School Park). The SES occupied the former schoolhouse while the former teacher's residence was used to house a caretaker. A new community centre was built on the site of the school's old tennis courts. The park and its facilities were managed the Yorkeys Knob Activities Group until August 2021, when the Cairns Regional Council took control.

Locals are attached to the name, despite the reaction it sometimes gets ("knob" being a slang term for penis), and successfully prevented a developer from advertising a development as being at "Yorkeys Beach".

Heritage listings 
Yorkeys Knob has a number of heritage-listed sites, including:
 40 Buckley Street: Second Innisfail Court House, relocated to Yorkeys Knob as a private residence

Education 
Yorkeys Knob State School is a government primary (Prep-6) school for boys and girls at 26-38 Clinton Street. In 2018, the school had an enrolment of 252 students with 19 teachers (16 full-time equivalent) and 13 non-teaching staff (8 full-time equivalent).

There are no secondary schools in Yorkeys Knob. The nearest government secondary school is the Tropical North Learning Academy (formerly Smithfield State High School) in neighbouring Smithfield to the west.

Facilities 
Yorkeys Knob SES Facility is in the former schoolhouse at Old School Park at 58-64 Wattle Street.

Amenities 
Yorkeys Knob has a supermarket, post office, bottleshop, bakery, and a variety of other shops. A newsagent and a small store are on the beachfront, near the main swimming area.

Half Moon Bay Marina is a  marina. At the marina are the Yorkeys Knob Boating Club. There is a public boat ramp at the marina; it is managed by the Cairns Regional Council.

Yorkeys Knob has three restaurants. One at the Half Moon Bay marina has an over-the-water deck looking across Half Moon Bay to Double Island and Haycock Island (also known as Scout's Hat due to its shape).

Half Moon Bay Golf Club is located at the western end of Wattle Street, and is a short but challenging layout which features a number of water hazards. It is 5,129 metres long and par is 70. Most of the course is sand-based, and it dries rapidly after heavy rains. A nine-hole course is generally open even if all the other Cairns courses are closed due to flooding, although cyclones can force its closure for a couple of days.
The swimming area is at the northern end of Sims Esplanade. It is patrolled for six months of the year by Surf Lifesaving Queensland, and has a stinger net to protect swimmers from box jellyfish (Chironex fleckeri). The safest swimming is between the flags placed by the lifesavers; there have been drownings around the rocks a short distance away. There are barbecue and picnic facilities, plus public toilets and showers. The beach is lined with she-oak casuarinas, beach almonds, ballnuts and coconut palms. At its southern end the beach meets Thomatis Creek, which lies between Yorkeys Knob and Holloways Beach. The beach is a popular for kitesurfing and windsurfing.

There are a number of parks in the area:
 Haling Park
 Old School Park, corner of Wattle Street and Cunningham Street
 Ray Howarth Park

Attractions 
Cairns Go Kart Track is on the corner of Walker Street and the Captain Cook Highway.

Wildlife

The golf club is a very good bird-watching location, with masked lapwings, bush stone-curlews, a range of kingfishers, rainbow lorikeets and sea eagles fairly easy to find. Between the 12th and 13th holes lies Ray Howarth Park, which is home to a huge colony of flying foxes, which you can see heading out searching for food in the early evenings. During the day they hang upside down from the mangrove's trees, and make an almighty din. When the melaleucas are in flower you will find them gorging on nectar in the trees at the northern end of Sim's Esplanade.

A small bush track near the State school offers a chance to see a variety of birdlife, monitor lizards, and many skinks. Along the beach you will find pied oyster catchers, bush stone-curlews, ghost fiddler crabs and sand-bubbler crabs. At the rocks at the end of the beach keep an eye out of the beach tree skink scampering around the rocks looking for lunch, while you also watching for a pod of bottlenose dolphins that sometimes visit the small bay on the northern side of the groyne.

Transport
Yorkeys Knob is serviced by Sunbus seven days a week. The normal service, the 112, runs hourly Monday to Sunday. This service runs to the Smithfield shopping centre, the nearest large shopping complex, where there is a connection on the 120 to Cairns City. A direct service, the 113, is available during the peak periods, travelling to Cairns in the mornings and back to Yorkeys in the late afternoon.

References

External links

Yorkeys Knob tourism site
Yorkeys Knob Sunbus Service
Yorkeys Knob named in Unfortunate names list
University of Queensland: Queensland Places: Yorkeys Knob

Suburbs of Cairns
Beaches of Queensland